is a railway station in the city of Kasugai, Aichi Prefecture,  Japan, operated by Meitetsu.

Lines

Station layout
The station has one island platforms connected to the station building by a level crossing. The station has automated ticket machines, Manaca automated turnstiles and is unattended..

Platforms

Adjacent stations

|-
!colspan=5|Nagoya Railroad

Station history
Ushiyama Station was opened on February 11, 1931.

Passenger statistics
In fiscal 2017, the station was used by an average of 2441 passengers daily.

Surrounding area
JASDF Komaki Air Base is within a five-minute walking distance to the main gate of Komaki Air Base operated by Japan Air Self-Defense Force.  The train station and the base are located on the east side of Nagoya Airfield.

See also
 List of Railway Stations in Japan

References

External links

 Official web page 

Railway stations in Japan opened in 1931
Railway stations in Aichi Prefecture
Stations of Nagoya Railroad
Kasugai, Aichi